Santosh Padmakar Pawar (born 1972) is an Indian poet, musician, actor, dramatist, theatre director and script writer in Marathi language. He is best known for his long poem "Bhramisthacha Jahirnama" from 2005, and for his 2010 play Yadaa Kadachit.

Biography
Santosh Pawar is a teacher and lecturer in Marathi literature. He served as a lecturer in Annasaheb Awate Arts, Commerce & Hutatma Babu Genu Science College.

Works
Pawar's poems have been included in several anthologies, and are also included in the curriculum of several Indian universities. His comedy drama Yadaa Kadachit, based on stories from the Ramayana and the Mahabharata was critically acclaimed. The play was the target of heavy criticism from religious fundamentalist groups who saw it as disrespectful, and who threatened the playwright and the actors, creating violent disturbances during several performances. Yadaa Kadachit nevertheless continued to be a popular play, which had been performed more than 4500 times by 2018.

Pawar has also performed as actor, director, producer and script writer in several movies. He has done designing work for several Bollywood movies like Om Shanti Om, Queen and Thalaivi.

Awards and recognition
 2022 : Jibanananda Das Award for English translation of Pawar's poetry by Santosh Rathod

Major works

Drama scripts
 Amhi Saare Lekurwaale
 Jalubhai Halu
 Yadaa Kdachit
 Radha Hi Kabri Babri
 Lage Raho Rajabhai
 Haus Majhi Poorvaa

Movie scripts

Acting
 Navara Majha Navasacha (Movie)
 Fu Bai Fu (Television)
 Ek Unaad Diwas (Drama)
 Tu Tu Mi Mi (Drama)
 Raja Navacha Gulaam (Drama)

Direction

References 

1955 births
Marathi-language writers
Living people
Writers from Maharashtra
Indian male poets
20th-century Indian writers
Indian actors
20th-century Indian male writers